Route 92 is a major east–west highway on the island of Oahu which begins at exit 15 off Interstate H-1 (H-1) in Honolulu and ends  east of the Ala Wai Canal crossing in Waikiki. The western portion, west of Richards Street, is locally known as the Nimitz Highway (named after Pacific Fleet Admiral during World War II, Chester Nimitz). East of Richards Street, Route 92 is locally known as Ala Moana Boulevard.

Route description

After exiting H-1, Route 92 goes past the Pearl Harbor Naval Base and Hickam Air Force Base gates. Route 92 goes under the Airport Viaduct (H-1) and serves primary route for Honolulu International Airport. Route 92 briefly runs underneath H-1 before exiting again at exit 18. Heading east, Route 92 enters into the Port of Honolulu and downtown Honolulu. After crossing the Ala Wai Canal to Waikiki, Route 92 ends, and county jurisdiction is transferred at that point.

History
The route was constructed in the 1940s during World War II to serve military facilities and the local airport. There were plans in the 1960s to extend the road east of the Ala Moana Shopping Center toward H-1 once again, but those plans were dropped by the late 1970s.

Major intersections

References

External links

Hawaii Highways - Oahu Route List

0092
Transportation in Honolulu County, Hawaii
Transportation in Honolulu